Budapest, the capital of Hungary has 23 districts, each with its own municipal government.

The number of districts in Budapest
Budapest was organized into 10 districts (numbered from I to X) in 1873 after the unification of the cities of Pest, Buda and Óbuda. The districts at that time:
Buda: I, II
Óbuda: III
Pest: IV, V, VI, VII, VIII, IX, X
In the 1930s, 4 new districts were organized, numbered from XI to XIV. On 1 January 1950, 7 neighboring towns and 16 villages were annexed to Budapest by creating 9 new districts, so the number of its districts increased to 22. District IV was annexed to District V and the number IV was given to the northernmost newly merged town, Újpest. Former district borders were also partly modified but the old numbering system is still clear on the map. In 1994, Soroksár left District XX, became the newest district and received the number XXIII.

Districts
Listed below are the ordinal numbers of the 23 districts of Budapest, their official names (if there is one), and the names of the neighbourhoods within the districts. Each district can be associated with one or more neighbourhoods named after former towns within Budapest.
Buda is the hilly part on the west bank of the Danube (red cells in the table below), Districts I, II, III, XI, XII, XXII
Pest is the flat part on the east bank of the Danube (green cells in the table below). Districts IV, V, VI, VII, VIII, IX, X, XIII, XIV, XV, XVI, XVII, XVIII, XIX, XX, XXIII
Csepel is a big island in the south which barely belongs to Budapest. This part of the island is the District XXI and is also referred as Csepel.
Margaret Island is an island that is directly administered by the Municipality of Budapest (used to be part of District XIII) and is used as a recreational area
There is a third island called Óbuda Island (Óbudai-sziget) which forms parts of District III and hosts the Sziget Festival since 1993.

List of districts by population, territory and population density

Arrangement of districts
District I is a small area in central Buda (the western side), including the historic Castle. District II is in Buda again, in the northwest, and District III stretches along in the northernmost part of Buda.

To reach District IV, one must cross the Danube to find it in Pest (the eastern side), also at north. With District V, another circle begins: it is located in the absolute centre of Pest. Districts VI, VII, VIII and IX are the neighbouring areas to the east, going southwards, one after the other.

District X is another, more external circle also in Pest, while one must jump to the Buda side again to find Districts XI and XII, going northwards. No more districts remaining in Buda in this circle, we must turn our steps to Pest again to find Districts XIII, XIV, XV, XVI, XVII, XVIII, XIX and XX (mostly external city parts), almost regularly in a semicircle, going southwards again.

District XXI is the extension of the above route over a branch of the Danube, the northern tip of a long island (Csepel-sziget) south from Budapest. District XXII is still on the same route in southwest Buda, and finally District XXIII is again in southernmost Pest, irregular only because it was part of District XX until the mid-90s.

Twin towns - sister cities (districts)

Budapest I – Várkerület

 Capestrano, Italy
 Carouge, Switzerland
 Innere Stadt (Vienna), Austria
 Lendava, Slovenia
 Marlow, England, United Kingdom
 Mukachevo, Ukraine
 Odorheiu Secuiesc, Romania
 Old Town (Bratislava), Slovakia
 Prague 1 (Prague), Czech Republic
 Regensburg, Germany
 Senta, Serbia
 Śródmieście (Warsaw), Poland

Budapest II

 Finike, Turkey
 Mosbach, Germany
 Żoliborz (Warsaw), Poland

Budapest III – Óbuda-Békásmegyer

  Bemowo (Warsaw), Poland
 Billigheim, Germany
 Miercurea Ciuc, Romania
 Old Town (Košice), Slovakia
 Stirling, Scotland, United Kingdom
 Udine, Italy

District IV – Újpest

   Marzahn-Hellersdorf, Berlin, Germany
   Chalcis, Greece
   Tyresö, Sweden

Budapest V – Belváros-Lipótváros

 Bačka Topola, Serbia
 Charlottenburg-Wilmersdorf (Berlin), Germany
 Gheorgheni, Romania
 Inlăceni (Atid), Romania
 Old Town (Kraków), Poland

 Rakhiv, Ukraine
 Rimetea, Romania
 Rožňava, Slovakia

Budapest VI – Terézváros

 Târgu Secuiesc, Romania
 Temerin, Serbia
 Zadar, Croatia 

Budapest VII – Erzsébetváros

 Karlovac, Croatia
 Nevers, France
 Safed, Israel

 Stari Grad (Belgrade), Serbia
 Stavroupoli, Greece
 Sveti Vlas (Nesebar), Bulgaria

Budapest VIII – Józsefváros
 Pescina, Italy

Budapest IX – Ferencváros

 Kanjiža, Serbia
 Kráľovský Chlmec, Slovakia
 Sfântu Gheorghe, Romania

Budapest X – Kőbánya

 Bălan, Romania
 Jarosław, Poland
 Letovice, Czech Republic
 Litochoro, Greece
 Štúrovo, Slovakia
 Vinkovci, Croatia
 Wolverhampton, England, United Kingdom

Budapest XI – Újbuda

 Ada, Serbia
 Bad Cannstatt (Stuttgart), Germany
 Bahçelievler (Istanbul), Turkey
 Bene, Ukraine
 Berehove Raion, Ukraine
 District 1 (Ho Chi Minh City), Vietnam
 Prague 5 (Prague), Czech Republic
 Ruse, Bulgaria
 Sânzieni, Romania
 Târgu Mureș, Romania
 Trogir, Croatia
 Trstice, Slovakia
 Ustroń, Poland
 Yiwu, China
 Żoliborz (Warsaw), Poland

Budapest XII – Hegyvidék
 Arad, Romania

Budapest XIII

 Floridsdorf (Vienna), Austria
 Košice-Juh (Košice), Slovakia
 Ochota (Warsaw), Poland
 Osijek, Croatia
 Sovata, Romania

Budapest XIV – Zugló

 Ciceu, Romania
 Opava, Czech Republic
 Racibórz, Poland
 Racoş, Romania
 Steglitz-Zehlendorf (Berlin), Germany
 Veliko Tarnovo, Bulgaria

Budapest XV

 Dabas, Hungary
 Donji Kraljevec, Croatia
 Liesing (Vienna), Austria
 Linyi, China
  Marzahn-Hellersdorf (Berlin), Germany
 Nad jazerom (Košice), Slovakia
 Obervellach, Austria
 Sanming, China
 Topliţa, Romania

Budapest XVI
 Tây Hồ District (Hanoi), Vietnam

Budapest XVII – Rákosmente

 Gheorgheni, Romania
 Krosno County, Poland
 Lovran, Croatia

Budapest XVIII – Pestszentlőrinc-Pestszentimre

 Artashat, Armenia
 Băile Tușnad, Romania
 Dąbrowa County, Poland
 Izvoru Crișului, Romania
 Moldava nad Bodvou, Slovakia
 Nesebar, Bulgaria
 Nin, Croatia
 Roding, Germany
 San Nicola la Strada, Italy
 Tiachiv, Ukraine

Budapest XIX – Kispest

 Krzeszowice, Poland
 Pendik (Istanbul), Turkey
 Smolyan, Bulgaria
 Sombor, Serbia
 Tășnad, Romania
 Vrbovec, Croatia

Budapest XX – Pesterzsébet

 Alushta, Ukraine / Russia
 Belin, Romania
 Cristuru Secuiesc, Romania
 Nowa Słupia, Poland
 Olgiate Comasco, Italy
 Nord-Ost (Frankfurt), Germany

Budapest XXI – Csepel

 Băile Tușnad, Romania
 Gănești, Romania
 Juankoski (Kuopio), Finland
 Kielce, Poland
 Neuenburg am Rhein, Germany
 Rijeka, Croatia
 Salonta, Romania

 Wołomin, Poland

Budapest XXII – Budafok-Tétény

 Baraolt, Romania
 Białołęka (Warsaw), Poland
 Bonn (Bonn), Germany

 Koson, Ukraine
 Kristianstad, Sweden
 Varna, Bulgaria

Budapest XXIII – Soroksár

 Nürtingen, Germany
 Odorheiu Secuiesc, Romania
 Törökbálint, Hungary
 Tvarditsa, Bulgaria

References

External links
 District I-X street maps clearly showing boundaries

Budapest-related lists
Budapest districts